Subangdaku, which means "wide river" in Cebuano, may refer to the following places in the Philippines:

 Subangdaku River, a river in the province of Southern Leyte
 Subangdaku, a barangay in the city of Mandaue